Rowat is a surname. Notable people with the surname include:

 Jessie Newbery (née Rowat, 1864–1948), Scottish artist and embroiderer
 Leanne Rowat, Canadian politician
 Linden Rowat (born 1989), Canadian hockey player

See also
 Rowan (name)
 Rowatt